Grand Bourgtheroulde is a commune in the Eure department in Normandy in northern France. Bourgtheroulde-Infreville is the municipal seat.

History 
The Battle of Bourgthéroulde was fought between English loyalists and Norman rebels in 1124. On 1 January 2016, Grand Bourgtheroulde was created by the merger of Bosc-Bénard-Commin, Bourgtheroulde-Infreville and Thuit-Hébert.

Population

References

Communes of Eure